Barbara Brackman (born July 6, 1945) is a quilter, quilt historian and author.

Barbara has written numerous books on quilting during the Civil War including Facts & Fabrications: Unraveling the History of Quilts and Slavery, Barbara Brackman's Civil War Sampler, Barbara Brackman's Encyclopedia of Appliqué, America's Printed Fabrics 1770-1890, Civil War Women, Clues in the Calico, Emporia Rose Appliqué Quilts, Making History–Quilts & Fabric from 1890-1970, and Quilts from the Civil War, all published by C&T Publishing. Her Encyclopedia of Pieced Quilt Patterns contains more than 4000 pieced quilt patterns, derived from printed sources published between 1830 and 1970.

She was inducted into the Quilters Hall of Fame of Marion, Indiana in 2001.

Works
Patterns of Progress: Quilts in the Machine Age, Autry Museum of Western Heritage, 1997, 
Quilts from the Civil War. C&T Publishing. 1997. . 

America's Printed Fabrics 1770-1890. C&T Publishing. 2004. .
Making History–Quilts & Fabric from 1890-1970. C&T Publishing. 2008. . 
Clues in the Calico. C&T Publishing. 2009. .

Emporia Rose Appliqué Quilts. C&T Publishing. 2014. .

Notes

External links
 
Works by or about Barbara Brackman in libraries (WorldCat catalog)

1945 births
Living people
21st-century American historians
American women artists
Artists from Kansas
Quilters
American women historians
21st-century American women writers
American art historians
Women art historians